This is a list of the colleges within the Chinese University of Hong Kong. As a collegiate university, the school comprises nine colleges that differ in character and history, each retaining substantial autonomy on institutional affairs: Chung Chi College, New Asia College, United College, Shaw College, Morningside College, S. H. Ho College, Lee Woo Sing College, Wu Yee Sun College and C. W. Chu College. All undergraduates are affiliated to one of them.

Colleges are designed as communities with their own hostels, dining halls and other facilities. Students receive pastoral care and whole-person education, including formal and non-formal general education by means of close interaction with teachers and peers, and in some colleges, assemblies and college final year project. Colleges promote extracurricular social and athletic activities with an aim of building camaraderie among students. This focus on 'student orientated teaching', education through both formal teaching and student empowerment, distinguishes CUHK from other universities in the territory.

When the structure of the university was revamped in 1976, and the autonomy of the colleges diminished, Lord Fulton clarified the role of the colleges: "the natural home of student-oriented teaching is the college [which] is an association of senior and junior members come together in pursuit of shared academic interests and aims." He wrote that the colleges help students achieve "a sense of his or her personal significance and responsibility, and on that basis to enrich the common life."

Colleges

References 

Chinese University of Hong Kong